Ana María Casanova (born August 16, 1946), known by her stage name Moria Casán, is an Argentine actress and TV personality.
Casán made her theatre debut in 1970, and quickly became one of the country's leading vedettes during Argentina's Golden Age of revue. Her sex symbol status was further cemented during the late 1970s and 1980s, as she starred in various sexual comedy films alongside Alberto Olmedo, Jorge Porcel and Susana Giménez. Since the mid-1980s, Casán has also established herself as an important TV personality, hosting various sketch comedy programs and talk shows throughout the years. Most recently, Casán was a judge in the popular TV competition Bailando por un Sueño from 2006 to 2017. She currently hosts the TV show Incorrectas and continues starring in several theatrical productions.

Casán remains a popular figure in Argentine showbusiness. Her insult comedy and off-color humor, popularized through her usual feuds with other media personalities, has generated various phrases that are now part of the national lexicon — the press has nicknamed her "karateka tongue". In 2013, the Buenos Aires Herald wrote that "[her] larger than life persona is a pop icon as much for her stage performances as for her bold, daring public statements." Casán is also "the great gay icon of the country", and a fixture in national LGBT culture; as the community sees "her as an icon of liberation and transgression." Her only daughter, Sofía Gala, is also an actress.

Career 

Casán was born in Buenos Aires. Following in the footsteps of Argentine revue diva Nélida Roca, Moria Casán became a stage sex symbol and chorus girl. She started as a dancer but immediately acquired major roles due to her versatility, powerful voice and on-screen presence. She worked with outstanding revue actors during the 1970s, such as Nélida Lobato, Adolfo Stray, Don Pelele, Pablo Barbieri, Juan Verdaguer, and José Marrone. She was the first revue girl to demand to leave sexual comments directed at her person off the stage, and to be placed at an equal level with a man. This significant change revolutionized the revue genre locally, and numerous prospective female stars took their cues from Casán in subsequent years.

Moria Casan was asked to express her opinion about a wide spectrum of topics in most of the country's leisure magazines. She became known for her musical shows and on television as a TV hostess and producer.  She was the first to have the protagonist role in music halls on TV, both as dancer and actress. Most of her film career has been made up of picaresque comedies, acting with well-known comedians as Alberto Olmedo, Jorge Porcel, and her friend, Susana Giménez. She married fellow actor Mario Castiglione in 1986, with whom she had a daughter, and, following an acrimonious divorce, remarried with Luis Vadalá.

Casán became among the most recognizable figures in Argentine television, and hosted numerous local variety shows since Monumental Moria in 1989, including A la cama con Moria in the early 1990s (in which guests were interviewed in a suggestively ample, round bed), Amor y Moria (Love and Moria) in the late '90s, and her 2000 talk show, Entre Moria y Vos (Between Moria and You). She has also appeared in the theatre, notably in Sebastián Moncada's Brujas (Witches), between 1991 and 1996. Casán ran a much-publicized, though unsuccessful, 2005 campaign for a seat in the lower house of Argentina's National Congress, the Chamber of Deputies, on the Movimiento Federal de Centro, a new center-right party she created.
 
After many years in the entertainment industry, Moria evolved into a "show woman"a Latin American term for a woman who can actually perform, rather than being a mere sex symbolbased on her multi-faceted talent and a peculiar phrasing that became popular among people of all ages.  Her later appearances included those in the popular sitcom, Doble vida, and in recurring seasons of Bailando por un Sueño (Dancing for a Dream), where she appeared between 2006 and 2008 as a contest judge. Remaining active in the theatre, in 2009 she performed in Une visite inopportune, by local playwright Copi, and directed by the French dramatist Stéphan Druet. She has also established a restaurant and an actors' and dancing school, the Escuela de Arte Moria Casán.

Among the phrases she popularized are '¿Quiénes son?' (Who are you) "si queres llorar, llorá" (if you want to cry, cry), "a-hora!" (right now!), "te lo pido por favor!" (I am asking you please!), "se colgaron de nuevo" (they're hung-up again), and more recently "what pass? qué pasa papi?" ('what pass,' what's happening daddy?) or "cuando fumo me siento una geisha" (when i smoke i feel like a geisha)  among many, many others.

Filmography

References

External links 

 
 
 

1946 births
Actresses from Buenos Aires
Argentine people of Italian descent
Living people
Argentine film actresses
Argentine stage actresses
Argentine television actresses
Argentine television personalities
Women television personalities
Argentine female dancers
Argentine vedettes
Argentine musical theatre actresses
Argentine musical theatre female dancers
Bailando por un Sueño (Argentine TV series) participants
Bailando por un Sueño (Argentine TV series) judges